The Outsider is a mixtape by American rapper G-Eazy. The mixtape was released on March 31, 2010.  The mixtape features guest appearances from Rich Boy and Marty Grimes.

Track listing

References

2011 mixtape albums